Sen Gopaul (born 18 February 1957) is a Guyanese cricketer. He played in eleven first-class matches for Guyana from 1975 to 1980.

See also
 List of Guyanese representative cricketers

References

External links
 

1957 births
Living people
Guyanese cricketers
Guyana cricketers
Sportspeople from Georgetown, Guyana